Ghana Naydenova (1851–1916), was a Bulgarian teacher, known for her participation in the national liberation movement. 

She was born in Sopot, educated in a girl school, and worked as a teacher in Sopot after graduation, and later in Klisura. She participated in the national liberation movement to free Bulgaria from the Ottoman Empire by sewing uniforms and raise funds for the movement. She famously participated in the April Uprising of 1878. When it was crushed, she was forced to hide in the woods. When she was captured, she was subjected to torture during the interrogation.

References
 Научноинформационен център „Българска енциклопедия“. Голяма енциклопедия „България“. Том 8. София, Книгоиздателска къща „Труд“, 2012. . с. 2947-2948.

1851 births
1916 deaths
19th-century Bulgarian people
People from Sopot, Plovdiv Province
April Uprising of 1876
Bulgarian educators
19th-century Bulgarian women